Strimnica is a village in the municipality of Želino, North Macedonia.

Demographics
As of the 2021 census, Strimnica had 1,937 residents with the following ethnic composition:
Albanians 1,862
Persons for whom data are taken from administrative sources 74
Others 1

According to the 2002 census, the village had a total of 2,422 inhabitants. Ethnic groups in the village include:
Albanians 2,404
Macedonians 2
Others 16

References

External links

Villages in Želino Municipality
Albanian communities in North Macedonia